The 2008-09 version of the Syrian Cup is the 39th edition to be played. It is the premier knockout tournament for football teams in Syria.

Al-Karamah went into this edition as the holders.

Calendar

First qualifying round

22 teams play a knockout tie. 11 clubs advance to the next round. Games played over two legs

|}

Second qualifying round

40 teams play a knockout tie. 20 clubs advance to the next round. Games played over two legs

|}

First round

32 teams play a knockout tie. 16 clubs advance to the next round. Games played over two legs

|}
¹ Areeha failed to the 2nd leg, match awarded 3-0 to Al-Sholla.

² Saraqib failed to the 2nd leg, match awarded 3-0 to Al-Yaqaza.

3 Al-Jazeera failed to the 2nd leg, match awarded 3-0 to Al-Jaish.

Round of 16

16 teams play a knockout tie. 8 clubs advance to the next round. Games played over two legs

|}
¹ Al-Sholla failed to the Round of 16, matches awarded 3-0 to Al-Taliya.

Quarter-finals

8 teams play a knockout tie. 4 clubs advance to the next round. Games played over two legs

|}

First leg

Second leg

Semi-finals
4 teams play a knockout tie. 2 clubs advance to the final. Games played over two legs

|}

First leg

Second leg

Final

Syrian Cup Winner

External links
 Details on goalzz.com

Syrian Cup, 2008-09
Cup
Syrian Cup